Tuchi Payeh Bast (also Romanized as Tūchī Pāyeh Bast) is a village in Howmeh Rural District, in the Central District of Rasht County, Gilan Province, Iran. At the 2006 census, its population was 212, in 63 families.

References 

Populated places in Rasht County